Groton High School is a historic high school building located at Groton in Tompkins County, New York. It was built in 1919–1920 and features Classical Revival details, such as six monumental engaged Doric order columns.  The front block of the building is three stories in height with a rear projection set back and reduced in height to two, then one, stories and forming a "T" shaped configuration.  The building ceased being used for educational purposes in 1975. The current high school campus is located in the south of the Village.

It was listed on the National Register of Historic Places in 1994.

References

School buildings on the National Register of Historic Places in New York (state)
Defunct schools in New York (state)
Neoclassical architecture in New York (state)
School buildings completed in 1920
Schools in Tompkins County, New York
National Register of Historic Places in Tompkins County, New York
1920 establishments in New York (state)